General Lord Robert Bertie (14 November 1721 – 10 March 1782) was a senior British Army officer and politician who sat in the House of Commons from 1751 to 1782.

Early life
Bertie was the fifth son of Robert Bertie, 1st Duke of Ancaster and the third son by the Duke's second wife Albinia Farrington and was educated at Eton College in 1728. In 1745 he inherited his mother's estate at Chislehurst.

Military career
Bertie joined the Coldstream Guards as an ensign in 1737, and was promoted to lieutenant in 1741 and captain in 1744. He was granted brevet rank as colonel in 1752, major-general in 1758, lieutenant-general in 1760 and general in 1777.

He was Regimental Colonel of the 7th Regiment of Foot from 1754 to 1776, and of the 2nd Troop of Horse Guards from 1776 to 1782. Bertie also commanded a regiment of fusiliers which filled billets to Admiral John Byng's fleet in 1756, then short of men. Bertie later defended the admiral at Byng's court-martial. He was Governor of Cork from 1762 to 1768 and Governor of Duncannon from 1768 to 1782.

Later career
Bertie was a Lord of the Bedchamber to the Prince of Wales, later King George III, from 1751 until his death. He sat in Parliament for Whitchurch from 1751 to 1754 and for Boston from 1754 to 1782.

Bertie died in 1782. In 1762 he had married Mary, widow of Robert Raymond, 2nd Baron Raymond and daughter of Montague Blundell, 1st Viscount Blundell; they had no children.

References

Sources
 Mary M. Drummond, BERTIE, Lord Robert (1721-82), of Chislehurst, Kent in The History of Parliament: the House of Commons 1754-1790 (1964). Online version Retrieved 25 August 2012.

1721 births
1782 deaths
People educated at Eton College
British Life Guards officers
Coldstream Guards officers
Younger sons of dukes
Royal Fusiliers officers
British Army generals
British MPs 1747–1754
British MPs 1754–1761
British MPs 1761–1768
British MPs 1768–1774
British MPs 1774–1780
British MPs 1780–1784
Members of the Parliament of Great Britain for English constituencies
Robert